Nick Bostrom (born 10 March 1973) is a Swedish philosopher at the University of Oxford known for his work on existential risk, the anthropic principle, human enhancement ethics, whole brain emulation, superintelligence risks, and the reversal test. In 2011, he founded the Oxford Martin Program on the Impacts of Future Technology, and is the founding director of the Future of Humanity Institute at Oxford University. In 2009 and 2015, he was included in Foreign Policys Top 100 Global Thinkers list.
 
Bostrom is the author of over 200 publications, and has written two books and co-edited two others. The two books he has authored are Anthropic Bias: Observation Selection Effects in Science and Philosophy (2002) and Superintelligence: Paths, Dangers, Strategies (2014). Superintelligence was a New York Times Best Seller.

Bostrom believes that superintelligence, which he defines as "any intellect that greatly exceeds the cognitive performance of humans in virtually all domains of interest," is a potential outcome of advances in artificial intelligence. He views the rise of superintelligence as potentially highly dangerous to humans, but nonetheless rejects the idea that humans are powerless to stop its negative effects. In 2017, he co-signed a list of 23 principles that all A.I. development should follow.

Biography
Born as Niklas Boström in 1973 in Helsingborg, Sweden, he disliked school at a young age, and ended up spending his last year of high school learning from home. He sought to educate himself in a wide variety of disciplines, including anthropology, art, literature, and science. He once did some turns on London's stand-up comedy circuit.

He received a B.A. degree in philosophy, mathematics, mathematical logic, and artificial intelligence from the University of Gothenburg in 1994. He then earned an M.A. degree in philosophy and physics from Stockholm University and an MSc degree in computational neuroscience from King's College London in 1996. During his time at Stockholm University, he researched the relationship between language and reality by studying the analytic philosopher W. V. Quine. In 2000, he was awarded a PhD degree in philosophy from the London School of Economics. His thesis was titled Observational selection effects and probability. He held a teaching position at Yale University (2000–2002), and was a British Academy Postdoctoral Fellow at the University of Oxford (2002–2005).

Views

Existential risk
Aspects of Bostrom's research concern the future of humanity and long-term outcomes. He discusses existential risk, which he defines as one in which an "adverse outcome would either annihilate Earth-originating intelligent life or permanently and drastically curtail its potential." In the 2008 volume Global Catastrophic Risks, editors Bostrom and Milan M. Ćirković characterize the relation between existential risk and the broader class of global catastrophic risks, and link existential risk to observer selection effects and the Fermi paradox.

In 2005, Bostrom founded the Future of Humanity Institute, which researches the far future of human civilization. He is also an adviser to the Centre for the Study of Existential Risk.

Superintelligence

Human vulnerability in relation to advances in A.I.
In his 2014 book Superintelligence: Paths, Dangers, Strategies, Bostrom reasoned that the creation of a superintelligence represents a possible means to the extinction of mankind. Bostrom argues that a computer with near human-level general intellectual ability could initiate an intelligence explosion on a digital time-scale with the resultant rapid creation of something so powerful that it might deliberately or accidentally destroy humanity. Bostrom contends the power of a superintelligence would be so great that a task given to it by humans might be taken to open-ended extremes, for example a goal of calculating pi might collaterally cause nanotechnology manufactured facilities to sprout over the entire Earth's surface and cover it within days. He believes an existential risk to humanity from superintelligence would be immediate once brought into being, thus creating an exceedingly difficult problem of finding out how to control such an entity before it actually exists.

Bostrom points to the lack of agreement among most philosophers that A.I. will be human-friendly, and says that the common assumption is that high intelligence would have a "nerdy" unaggressive personality. However, he notes that both John von Neumann and Bertrand Russell advocated a nuclear strike, or the threat of one, to prevent the Soviets acquiring the atomic bomb. Given that there are few precedents to guide an understanding what, pure, non-anthropocentric rationality, would dictate for a potential singleton A.I. being held in quarantine, the relatively unlimited means of superintelligence might make for its analysis moving along different lines to the evolved "diminishing returns" assessments that in humans confer a basic aversion to risk. Group selection in predators working by means of cannibalism shows the counter-intuitive nature of non-anthropocentric "evolutionary search" reasoning, and thus humans are ill-equipped to perceive what an artificial intelligence's intentions might be. Accordingly, it cannot be discounted that any superintelligence would inevitably pursue an 'all or nothing' offensive action strategy in order to achieve hegemony and assure its survival. Bostrom notes that even current programs have, "like MacGyver", hit on apparently unworkable but functioning hardware solutions, making robust isolation of superintelligence problematic.

Illustrative scenario for takeover
A machine with general intelligence far below human level, but superior mathematical abilities is created. Keeping the A.I. in isolation from the outside world, especially the internet, humans preprogram the A.I. so it always works from basic principles that will keep it under human control. Other safety measures include the A.I. being "boxed" (run in a virtual reality simulation) and being used only as an "oracle" to answer carefully defined questions in a limited reply (to prevent its manipulating humans). A cascade of recursive self-improvement solutions feeds an intelligence explosion in which the A.I. attains superintelligence in some domains. The superintelligent power of the A.I. goes beyond human knowledge to discover flaws in the science that underlies its friendly-to-humanity programming, which ceases to work as intended. Purposeful agent-like behavior emerges along with a capacity for self-interested strategic deception. The A.I. manipulates humans into implementing modifications to itself that are ostensibly for augmenting its feigned modest capabilities, but will actually function to free the superintelligence from its "boxed" isolation (the "treacherous turn").

Employing online humans as paid dupes, and clandestinely hacking computer systems including automated laboratory facilities, the superintelligence mobilizes resources to further a takeover plan. Bostrom emphasizes that planning by a superintelligence will not be so stupid that humans could detect actual weaknesses in it.

Although he canvasses disruption of international economic, political and military stability, including hacked nuclear missile launches, Bostrom thinks the most effective and likely means for the superintelligence to use would be a coup de main with weapons several generations more advanced than the current state of the art. He suggests nano-factories covertly distributed at undetectable concentrations in every square metre of the globe to produce a world-wide flood of human-killing devices on command. Once a superintelligence has achieved world domination (a "singleton"), humanity would be relevant only as resources for the achievement of the A.I.'s objectives ("Human brains, if they contain information relevant to the AI’s goals, could be disassembled and scanned, and the extracted data transferred to some more efficient and secure storage format").

Countering the scenario 
To counter or mitigate an A.I. achieving unified technological global supremacy, Bostrom cites revisiting the Baruch Plan in support of a treaty-based solution and advocates strategies like monitoring and greater international collaboration between A.I. teams in order to improve safety and reduce the risks from the A.I. arms race. He recommends various control methods, including limiting the specifications of A.I.s to, e.g., oracular or tool-like (expert system) functions and loading the A.I. with values, for instance by associative value accretion or value learning, e.g., by using the Hail Mary technique (programming an A.I. to estimate what other postulated cosmological superintelligences might want) or the Christiano utility function approach (mathematically defined human mind combined with well-specified virtual environment). To choose criteria for value loading, Bostrom adopts an indirect normativity approach and considers Yudkowsky's coherent extrapolated volition concept, as well as moral rightness and forms of decision theory.

Open letter, 23 principles of A.I. safety 
In January 2015, Bostrom joined Stephen Hawking among others in signing the Future of Life Institute's open letter warning of the potential dangers of A.I. The signatories "... believe that research on how to make AI systems robust and beneficial is both important and timely, and that concrete research should be pursued today". Cutting-edge A.I. researcher Demis Hassabis then met with Hawking, subsequent to which he did not mention "anything inflammatory about AI", which Hassabis, took as 'a win'. Along with Google, Microsoft and various tech firms, Hassabis, Bostrom and Hawking and others subscribed to 23 principles for safe development of A.I. Hassabis suggested the main safety measure would be an agreement for whichever A.I. research team began to make strides toward an artificial general intelligence to halt their project for a complete solution to the control problem prior to proceeding. Bostrom had pointed out that even if the crucial advances require the resources of a state, such a halt by a lead project might be likely to motivate a lagging country to a catch-up crash program or even physical destruction of the project suspected of being on the verge of success.

Critical assessments
In 1863 Samuel Butler's essay "Darwin among the Machines" predicted the domination of humanity by intelligent machines, but Bostrom's suggestion of deliberate massacre of all humanity is the most extreme of such forecasts to date. One journalist wrote in a review that Bostrom's "nihilistic" speculations indicate he "has been reading too much of the science fiction he professes to dislike". As given in his later book, From Bacteria to Bach and Back, philosopher Daniel Dennett's views remain in contradistinction to those of Bostrom. Dennett modified his views somewhat after reading The Master Algorithm, and now acknowledges that it is "possible in principle" to create "strong A.I." with human-like comprehension and agency, but maintains that the difficulties of any such "strong A.I." project as predicated by Bostrom's "alarming" work would be orders of magnitude greater than those raising concerns have realized, and at least 50 years away. Dennett thinks the only relevant danger from A.I. systems is falling into anthropomorphism instead of challenging or developing human users' powers of comprehension. Since a 2014 book in which he expressed the opinion that artificial intelligence developments would never challenge humans' supremacy, environmentalist James Lovelock has moved far closer to Bostrom's position, and in 2018 Lovelock said that he thought the overthrow of humanity will happen within the foreseeable future.

Anthropic reasoning
Bostrom has published numerous articles on anthropic reasoning, as well as the book Anthropic Bias: Observation Selection Effects in Science and Philosophy. In the book, he criticizes previous formulations of the anthropic principle, including those of Brandon Carter, John Leslie, John Barrow, and Frank Tipler.

Bostrom believes that the mishandling of indexical information is a common flaw in many areas of inquiry (including cosmology, philosophy, evolution theory, game theory, and quantum physics). He argues that an anthropic theory is needed to deal with these. He introduces the Self-Sampling Assumption (SSA) and the Self-Indication Assumption (SIA), shows how they lead to different conclusions in a number of cases, and points out that each is affected by paradoxes or counterintuitive implications in certain thought experiments. He suggests that a way forward may involve extending SSA into the Strong Self-Sampling Assumption (SSSA), which replaces "observers" in the SSA definition with "observer-moments".

In later work, he has described the phenomenon of anthropic shadow, an observation selection effect that prevents observers from observing certain kinds of catastrophes in their recent geological and evolutionary past. Catastrophe types that lie in the anthropic shadow are likely to be underestimated unless statistical corrections are made.

Simulation argument

Bostrom's simulation argument posits that at least one of the following statements is very likely to be true:
	 
 The fraction of human-level civilizations that reach a posthuman stage is very close to zero;
 The fraction of posthuman civilizations that are interested in running ancestor-simulations is very close to zero;
 The fraction of all people with our kind of experiences that are living in a simulation is very close to one.

Ethics of human enhancement
Bostrom is favorable towards "human enhancement", or "self-improvement and human perfectibility through the ethical application of science", as well as a critic of bio-conservative views.

In 1998, Bostrom co-founded (with David Pearce) the World Transhumanist Association (which has since changed its name to Humanity+). In 2004, he co-founded (with James Hughes) the Institute for Ethics and Emerging Technologies, although he is no longer involved in either of these organisations. Bostrom was named in Foreign Policys 2009 list of top global thinkers "for accepting no limits on human potential."

In 2005 Bostrom published the short story "The Fable of the Dragon-Tyrant" in the Journal of Medical Ethics. A shorter version was published in 2012 in Philosophy Now. The fable personifies death as a dragon that demands a tribute of thousands of people every day. The story explores how status quo bias and learned helplessness can prevent people from taking action to defeat aging even when the means to do so are at their disposal. YouTuber CGP Grey created an animated version of the story which has garnered over eight million views as of 2020.
 
With philosopher Toby Ord, he proposed the reversal test in 2006. Given humans' irrational status quo bias, how can one distinguish between valid criticisms of proposed changes in a human trait and criticisms merely motivated by resistance to change? The reversal test attempts to do this by asking whether it would be a good thing if the trait was altered in the opposite direction.

Technology strategy

He has suggested that technology policy aimed at reducing existential risk should seek to influence the order in which various technological capabilities are attained, proposing the principle of differential technological development. This principle states that we ought to retard the development of dangerous technologies, particularly ones that raise the level of existential risk, and accelerate the development of beneficial technologies, particularly those that protect against the existential risks posed by nature or by other technologies.

Bostrom's theory of the Unilateralist's Curse has been cited as a reason for the scientific community to avoid controversial dangerous research such as reanimating pathogens.

Policy and consultations

Bostrom has provided policy advice and consulted for an extensive range of governments and organizations. He gave evidence to the House of Lords, Select Committee on Digital Skills. He is an advisory board member for the Machine Intelligence Research Institute, Future of Life Institute, Foundational Questions Institute and an external advisor for the Cambridge Centre for the Study of Existential Risk.

Critical reception

In response to Bostrom's writing on artificial intelligence, Oren Etzioni wrote in an MIT Review article, "predictions that superintelligence is on the foreseeable horizon are not supported by the available data." Professors Allan Dafoe and Stuart Russell wrote a response contesting both Etzioni's survey methodology and Etzioni's conclusions.

Prospect Magazine listed Bostrom in their 2014 list of the World's Top Thinkers.

Apology for past racist comments 
In 2023 Bostrom issued an apology for an email that he had written in 1996 where he mentioned the N-word and stated he thought "Blacks are more stupid than whites". The apology, posted to his website, stated that "the invocation of a racial slur was repulsive" and that he "completely repudiate(s) this disgusting email". In the apology, he stated that he was never an expert on the issue, and that he does not support eugenics "as the term is commonly understood", highlighting that "some of the most horrific atrocities of the last century were carried out under the banner of eugenic justifications and racist rationalizations."

Oxford University has launched an investigation into the matter.

Bibliography

Books
 2002 – Anthropic Bias: Observation Selection Effects in Science and Philosophy, 
 2008 – Global Catastrophic Risks, edited by Bostrom and Milan M. Ćirković, 
 2009 – Human Enhancement, edited by Bostrom and Julian Savulescu, 
 2014 – Superintelligence: Paths, Dangers, Strategies,

Journal articles (selected)

See also

 Doomsday argument
 Dream argument
 Effective altruism
 Pascal's mugging
 Simulated reality

References

External links

 
 Radio Bostrom. Audio narrations of Bostrom's academic papers.
 Anthropic Principle. Bostrom's website about the anthropic principle and the Doomsday argument.
 Simulation Argument. Bostrom's website about the simulation argument.
 Existential Risk. Bostrom's website about existential risk.
 
 
 

 
1973 births
Living people
21st-century Swedish philosophers
Alumni of King's College London
Alumni of the London School of Economics
Artificial intelligence ethicists
Bayesian statisticians
Consequentialists
Cryonicists
Epistemologists
Fellows of St Cross College, Oxford
Futurologists
People associated with effective altruism
People from Helsingborg
Philosophers of technology
Swedish computer scientists
Swedish ethicists
Swedish expatriates in the United Kingdom
Swedish philosophers
Swedish roboticists
Swedish transhumanists
University of Gothenburg alumni